Averbode may refer to:
 , a village in Scherpenheuvel-Zichem, Belgium
 Averbode Abbey, an abbey in the village
 , see Beer in Belgium
 Averbode (publisher), a publishing company owned by the abbey